The 1989 Association of Mid-Continent Universities Tournament took place from May 12 through 14. The top 4 regular season finishers of the league's seven teams met in the double-elimination tournament held in Chicago, Illinois.  won the tournament for the sixth time.  The Bears would leave the conference after the 1990 season, the first time they did not win the Tournament.

Format and seeding
The top two teams from each division advanced to the tournament.  The top seed from each division played the second seed from the opposite division in the second round.

Tournament

All-Tournament Team

Tournament Most Valuable Player
Earnie Johns of Southwest Missouri State was named Tournament MVP.

References

Tournament
Summit League Baseball Tournament
Association of Mid-Continent Universities baseball tournament
Association of Mid-Continent Universities baseball tournament